Mohamed Abo Elala is an Egyptian football player. The left-footed can play either as a central midfielder or left wingback. Abo Elala was a former Zamalek captain.

Club career

Zamalek
Mohamed Aboul Ela played for El Zamalek for 21 years; since he was 8 years old until 29.

El-Entag El-Harby
In summer 2009, Aboul Ela moved to El-Entag El-Harby (aka Military Production) for a one-season contract. He redeemed himself at the newly promoted team in the Premier League and scored 2 goals in the 2009–10 season. By the end of that season, Aboul Ela refused to renew his contract with El-Entag El-Harby.

ENPPI
On 17 May 2010, ENPPI announced through its official web site the signing of Aboul Ela. He penned a five-season contract.

Titles as a player 
Source:

Egypt
Francophone Games' Bronze Medalist with Egyptian Olympic Team 2001
African Youth Cup of Nations Under 17 years Title 1997

Zamalek
 Egyptian Premier League: 2000–01, 2002–03, 2003–04
 Egyptian Super Cup: 2000–01, 2001–02
 Egypt Cup: 1999–00, 2001–02, 2007–08
 African Cup Winners' Cup: 2000
 CAF Champions League: 2002
 CAF Super Cup: 2003
 Afro-Asian Club Championship: 1997
 Arab Champions League: 2003
 Saudi-Egyptian Super Cup: 2003

ENPPI
 Egypt Cup: 2010–11

References

External links

Zamalek SC players
El Entag El Harby SC players
ENPPI SC players
Egyptian footballers
Egypt international footballers
Living people
1980 births
Sportspeople from Giza
2002 African Cup of Nations players
Egyptian Premier League players
Association football midfielders
Wadi Degla SC players